Acanthophippium bicolor is a species of orchid that is native to South India, Sri Lanka and New Guinea.

References

External links 
 
 

bicolor
Orchids of India
Orchids of New Guinea
Orchids of Sri Lanka
Plants described in 1835